Alan Garen was an American geneticist who co-discovered suppressor mutations for tRNA. The Garen lab also showed that certain triplet codons (5'-UAG, 5'-UAA, and 5'-UGA) failed to bind amino acids. Thus, the Garen lab and Brenner labs are both credited with discovery of the stop codons of the genetic code. Garen was a professor at Yale University between 1963 and 2021. He was a member of the National Academy of Sciences and the American Academy of Arts and Sciences.

References

External links
 Garen's webpage at Yale's Dept. of Molecular Biophysics and Biochemistry
 Academic genealogy of Alan Garen 

1926 births
2022 deaths
Members of the United States National Academy of Sciences
21st-century American biologists